Martin Odersky (born 5 September 1958) is a German computer scientist and professor of programming methods at École Polytechnique Fédérale de Lausanne (EPFL) in Switzerland. He specializes in code analysis and programming languages. He designed with help from others the Scala programming language and Generic Java (and Pizza before).

In 1989, he received his Ph.D. from ETH Zurich under the supervision of Niklaus Wirth, who is best known as the designer of several programming languages, including Pascal. He did postdoctoral work at IBM and Yale University.

In 1997, he implemented the GJ compiler, and his implementation became the basis of javac, the Java compiler.

In 2002, he and others began working on Scala which had its first public release in 2003.

In 2007, he was inducted as a Fellow of the Association for Computing Machinery.

On 12 May 2011, Odersky and collaborators launched Typesafe Inc. (renamed Lightbend Inc.), a company to provide commercial support, training, and services for Scala.

He teaches three courses on the Coursera online learning platform: Functional Programming Principles in Scala, Functional Program Design in Scala and Programming Reactive Systems .

See also
 Timeline of programming languages
 Scala programming language

References

External links

Biographical notice, EPFL website

Interview with Martin Odersky about Scala Dr. Dobb's, 2011
Martin Odersky on the Future of Scala, Interview by Sadek Drobi on Jan 10, 2012

Living people
German computer scientists
Programming language designers
Programming language researchers
Fellows of the Association for Computing Machinery
Scala (programming language)
1958 births
ETH Zurich alumni
Academic staff of the École Polytechnique Fédérale de Lausanne